Hertsenberg is a surname. Notable people with the surname include:
 Antoinette Hertsenberg (born 1964), Dutch television presenter
 Eddie Hertsenberg (born 1986), American soccer player